Steven ("Steve") Micael Plasencia (born October 28, 1956 in Minneapolis, Minnesota) is a former American long-distance runner. Plasencia competed in the 10,000 metres at the 1988 Summer Olympics and the 1992 Summer Olympics. In the closest 1-2 finish in the race's history, Plasencia edged out Keith Brantly by one second to win the 1992 California International Marathon (2:14:14).  His 14:02.86 5000 metres at the Drake Relays at the age of 40 was the American Masters record until 2014 when it was broken by Bernard Lagat.

Plasencia was the head cross-country and assistant track and field coach at the University of Minnesota, until his retirement in 2021, where he won three Indoor Big Ten Track and Field Championships (2009, 2010, 2011) and two Outdoor Big Ten Track and Field Championships (2009, 2010) .

Achievements
All results regarding marathon, unless stated otherwise

Personal records
 5000 m  - 13:19.37 (Oslo, Norway, July 27, 1985)
 10000 m  - 27:45.20 (Seattle,        
 
Washington, July 25, 1990)
 Marathon - 2:12.51
 2 time Olympian

References

External links

Profile at www.gophersports.com

1956 births
Living people
Olympic track and field athletes of the United States
American male long-distance runners
Athletes (track and field) at the 1988 Summer Olympics
Athletes (track and field) at the 1992 Summer Olympics
Athletes (track and field) at the 1995 Pan American Games
American masters athletes
Pan American Games track and field athletes for the United States